Alexander Orr Vietor (1913 – March 9, 1981) was an American authority on marine Americana and maps. 

A graduate of Yale in the class of 1936, he served as curator of maps at Yale University from 1943 to 1978.

He was a member of the board of the New-York Historical Society and of the Acorn Club, to which he was elected in 1953.

He married Anna Glen Butler; they had four daughters and three sons.

See also 

Vietor Rock

External links 

Alexander Orr Vietor Collection (MS 542). Manuscripts and Archives, Yale University Library.
Alexander O. Vietor on Find a Grave

References 

1913 births
1981 deaths
Christians from Connecticut
20th-century American Episcopalians
Yale University alumni
Yale University staff